Mullah Abdul Rauf may refer to:
 Mullah Abdul Rauf (Taliban Governor)
 Abdul Rauf Aliza, (1981–2015), held in Guantanamo, and suspected of being a Taliban leader named Mullah Abdul Rauf